John Minford (born 22 June 1946) is a British sinologist and literary translator. He is primarily known for his translation of Chinese classics such as 40 chapters of The Story of the Stone, The Art of War, the I Ching and the Tao Te Ching. He has also translated Louis Cha's wuxia novel The Deer and the Cauldron (highly abridged in 28 chapters) and a selection of Pu Songling's Strange Tales from a Chinese Studio.

Life

Early years and education
John Minford was born in Birmingham, UK, in 1946. The son of a career diplomat, Leslie Mackay Minford, he grew up in Venezuela, Argentina and Egypt, before attending Horris Hill School, Newbury, Berkshire, and then Winchester College (1958–1963), where he studied Ancient Greek and Latin literature. He is the younger brother of prominent economist Patrick Minford. At Winchester he took piano lessons with Christopher Cowan. In 1963-4, he continued his piano studies with Walter Kamper in Vienna, and from 1964 to 1966 with David Parkhouse in London. He entered Balliol College, Oxford, in 1964 on a classical scholarship and obtained first class honours in Chinese Literature in 1968. He completed his PhD at the Australian National University in 1980, under the supervision of Dr Pierre Ryckmans and Professor Liu Ts'un-yan.

Career
He has held a number of teaching posts in mainland China, Hong Kong, Australia and New Zealand. In 1982, he joined the staff of the Research Centre for Translation at the Chinese University of Hong Kong, working closely with Stephen Soong, 宋淇, and eventually taking over from him as editor of the journal Renditions.  His later positions included that of Chair Professor of Chinese at the University of Auckland (1986–1991) and at the Australian National University (2006–2016), Chair Professor of Translation at the Hong Kong Polytechnic University (1994–1999) and at the Chinese University of Hong Kong (2011–2013). In 2006, during his tenure as Dean of Arts and Social Sciences at the Open University of Hong Kong, he was one of the founding members of the Civic Party of Hong Kong. He is currently Emeritus Professor of Chinese at The Australian National University, and Sin Wai Kin Distinguished Professor of Chinese Culture and Translation at the Hang Seng University of Hong Kong. In November 2016 he was awarded the inaugural Medal for Excellence in Translation by the Australian Academy of Humanities, for his I Ching. He now divides his time between Featherston, New Zealand, and Fontmarty his old home near Tuchan, in the Corbières hills of the Languedoc.

In 2020-1 he finished editing a series of six titles from Hong Kong Literature for publication by the Chinese University Press of Hong Kong. This series consisted of Liu Yichang's stream-of-consciousness novel The Drunkard, two volumes of selected poetry and fiction by P. K. Leung (Lotus Leaves and Dragons), Xi Xi's contemporary book of biji sketches The Teddy Bear Chronicles, the personal memoir Ordinary Days by Leo Ou-fan Lee and Esther Lee, and a compendium of Hong Kong essays from 1840 to the present, The Best China.

Marriage
Minford was married in 1969 to Nickie Curteis, and they had two children, Emma and Luke. Nickie died in 1973. In 1977 he married Rachel May, the daughter of the noted sinologist David Hawkes.  They had two children, Daniel and Laura. Rachel died in January 2015. Hawkes was also Minford's teacher at Oxford University. Together, the two translated Cao Xueqin's The Story of the Stone, with Hawkes translating the first eighty chapters (Volumes 1–3) and Minford the last forty (Volumes 4–5).

Main publications
 1980 Miao Yüeh 繆鉞, The Chinese Lyric 論詞, in Soong ed., Song Without Music: Chinese Tz’u Poetry, Hong Kong, Chinese UP, 25–44
 1982 Cao Xueqin 曹雪芹 & Gao E 高鶚, The Story of the Stone 紅樓夢, vol 4, The Debt of Tears. Penguin Classics & Indiana University Press, 400 pp.
 1982 (assistant editor, for Liu Ts'un-yan柳存仁) ‘Chinese Middlebrow Fiction’, a Renditions book, Washington University Press. 
 1984 (edited with Stephen C. Soong 宋淇) Trees on the Mountain: An Anthology of New Chinese Writing, Chinese University Press, Hong Kong, 396 pp.
 1986 (edited with Geremie Barmé) Seeds of Fire: Chinese Voices of Conscience 火種, Far Eastern Economic Review, Hong Kong, 347 pp.
 1986 Cao Xueqin & Gao E, The Story of the Stone 紅樓夢, vol 5, The Dreamer Wakes. Penguin Classics & Indiana University Press, 385 pp.
 1987 (edited, with Siu-kit Wong) Chinese: Classical, Modern and Humane – Collected Essays of David Hawkes, Hong Kong, Chinese University Press, 327 pp.
 1987 (with Pang Bingjun & Séan Golden) One Hundred Modern Chinese Poems 中國現代詩一百首. Commercial Press, Hong Kong, 348 pp.
 1995 Pieces of Eight: Reflections on Translating The Story of the Stone, in Eoyang and Lin eds., Translating Chinese Literature, Indiana University Press, 178–203.
 1997 Louis Cha (Jin Yong 金庸), The Deer and the Cauldron: A Martial Arts Novel 鹿鼎記, The First Book. Oxford University Press, Hong Kong, xxxiii & 475 pp.
 1998 The Chinese Garden: Death of a Symbol, in Studies in the History of Gardens and Designed Landscapes (vol 18, no. 3), 257–268.
 1999 Death in Macau: In Defence of Orientalism, in Günter Wohlfart et al. eds., Translation und Interpretation, Munich, Wilhelm Fink, 143–156.
 1999 Louis Cha (Jin Yong 金庸), The Deer and the Cauldron: A Martial Arts Novel, The Second Book. Oxford University Press, Hong Kong, xxxi & 564 pp.
 2000 (edited, with Joseph S.M.Lau) Chinese Classical Literature: An Anthology of Translations. 1st vol, New York & Hong Kong, Columbia UP & Chinese UP, lix & 1176 pp. 2nd vol, forthcoming.
 2002 Sunzi, The Art of War 孫子兵法. New York, Viking Books. Lvi & 325 pp. (subsequent paperback, Penguin Classics, 2003)
 2002 Louis Cha (Jin Yong 金庸), The Deer and the Cauldron: A Martial Arts Novel, The Third Book. Oxford University Press, Hong Kong, xlix & 535 pp. With Rachel May
 2003 (edited with Rachel May) A Birthday Book for Brother Stone: For David Hawkes at Eighty. Chinese University Press, xi & 365 pp.
 2005 Soong Hsun-leng 宋訓倫, The Fragrant Hermitage 馨菴詞稿. Twenty-nine Lyric Poems, translated from the Chinese, Taiwan, SKS. 5–86.
 2006 Pu Songling 蒲松齡, Strange Tales from a Chinese Studio 聊齋誌異, London, Penguin Classics, xxxviii + 562 pp. (translations, including lengthy introduction, glossary and bibliography) 
 2007 (with Brian Holton and Agnes Hung-chong Chan) Leung Ping-kwan, Islands and Continents. Hong Kong University Press, xviii and 128 pp.
 2008 'One Moon One Heart:Thirty Ancient Chinese Fables' (Monte James Fine Art, San Francisco)
 2014 The I Ching: Book of Change 周易: A New Translation, New York, Viking/Penguin.
 2018 Laozi, Daodejing 道德經: A New Translation New York, Viking/Penguin.
 2020-2021 General Editor, 6-volume series, Hong Kong Literature, CUHK Press, Hong Kong.

References

External links
 John Minford's personal website

1946 births
Living people
People educated at Winchester College
Alumni of Balliol College, Oxford
Australian National University alumni
Chinese–English translators
British sinologists
Academic staff of the Australian National University
Academic staff of the University of Auckland
People from Birmingham, West Midlands